Dhruba Bahadur Pradhan is a Nepali politician belonging to Rastriya Prajatantra Party. Pradhan had been the chief of Nepal Police during the Maoist's Insurgency.

Pradhan is the current Vice president of Rastriya Prajatantra Party elected from the 2021 general convention of Rastriya Prajatantra Party.

Police career 
Dhruba Bahadur Pradhan was appointed Inspector General of Police (IGP) in 1997 A.D., but was then replaced by his predecessor, Achyut Krishna Kharel, due to certain "political instabilities (Bam Dev Gautam)", before again becoming IGP.

Political life 
Former IGP Dhruba Bahadur Pradhan, is currently Vice president of Rastriya Prajatantra Party. Pradhan was elected as the Vice president of Rastriya Prajatantra Party from Kamal Thapa Pannel.

References

Living people
Nepalese police officers
Rastriya Prajatantra Party politicians
Chiefs of police
Inspectors General of Police (Nepal)
2000s in Nepal
1949 births
People of the Nepalese Civil War
Nepal MPs 2022–present